Middleshaw is a hamlet on the B6254 road, near the village of Old Hutton, in the civil parish of Old Hutton and Holmescales, in the South Lakeland district, in the county of Cumbria, England. John Gough was from Middleshaw.

History 
The name "Middleshaw" means 'middle, sceaga', copse. Middleshaw was also known as Mid(d)leshaw(e).

See also

Listed buildings in Old Hutton and Holmescales

References 

Hamlets in Cumbria
South Lakeland District